Makhmudjon Shavkatov (born 26 June 1994) is an Uzbekistani freestyle wrestler. At the 2017 Asian Indoor and Martial Arts Games held in Ashgabat, Turkmenistan, he won the gold medal in the 57 kg event. He is also a two-time medalist at the Asian Wrestling Championships.

Career 

In 2018, he competed in the 57 kg event at the 2018 Asian Games held in Jakarta, Indonesia without winning a medal. He was eliminated from the competition in his fourth match by Kim Sung-gwon of South Korea.

In 2019, he won one of the bronze medals in the men's 57 kg event at the 2019 Asian Wrestling Championships held in Xi'an, China. In 2021, he won the bronze medal in the men's 57 kg event at the 2021 Waclaw Ziolkowski Memorial held in Warsaw, Poland.

Achievements

References

External links 
 

Living people
1994 births
Place of birth missing (living people)
Uzbekistani male sport wrestlers
Wrestlers at the 2018 Asian Games
Asian Games competitors for Uzbekistan
20th-century Uzbekistani people
21st-century Uzbekistani people